Kaczorów may refer to the following places in Poland:
Kaczorów, Lower Silesian Voivodeship (south-west Poland)
Kaczorów, Łódź Voivodeship (central Poland)